The 2022–23 Liga Portugal 2, also known as Liga Portugal SABSEG for sponsorship reasons, is the 33rd season of Portuguese football's second-tier league, and the third season under the current Liga Portugal 2 title. A total of 18 teams are competing in this division, including reserve sides from top-flight Primeira Liga teams.

Teams
A total of 18 teams contest the league, including 14 sides from the 2021–22 season, 2 teams relegated from the 2021–22 Primeira Liga and 2 promoted from the 2021–22 Liga 3.

Moreirense, Tondela and B-SAD were relegated to 2021–22 Liga Portugal 2 after finishing in 16th, 17th and 18th placed teams in 2021–22 Primeira Liga.

Torreense (promoted after a 24-year absence) and Oliveirense (promoted after a one-year absence) were promoted from the 2021–22 Liga 3, replacing Varzim and Académica.

Team changes

Relegated from 2021–22 Primeira Liga
Moreirense
Tondela
B-SAD

Promoted from 2021–22 Liga 3
Torreense
Oliveirense

Promoted to 2022–23 Primeira Liga
Rio Ave
Casa Pia
Chaves

Relegated to 2022–23 Liga 3
Varzim
Académica

Stadium and locations

Personnel and sponsors

Season summary

League table

Results

Positions by round
The table lists the positions of teams after each week of matches. In order to preserve chronological evolvements, any postponed matches are not included to the round at which they were originally scheduled, but added to the full round they were played immediately afterwards.

Number of teams by district

References

Liga Portugal 2 seasons
2022–23 in Portuguese football leagues
2022–23 in European second tier association football leagues
Current association football seasons